The Euroregion Elbe/Labe is one of the Euroregions with German and Czech participation. The purpose of the community of municipal interests is cross-border cooperation on a supranational level. The term is used to refer to both the organization and the geographical area of its operation.

Area and location 

The territory of the Euroregion Elbe/Labe includes on the German side the city of Dresden and the county of Sächsische Schweiz-Osterzgebirge, on the Czech side the territories of the former districts of Teplice, Ústí nad Labem, Děčín and Litoměřice. It occupies an area of 5400 km² and has about 1.3 million inhabitants, of which about 802,000 on the German side and about 495,000 on the Czech side (as of 2020).

It is named after the river Elbe (Czech: Labe). Characteristic natural areas are the Osterzgebirge, the Saxon Switzerland, the Saxon Elbeland with the Dresden Elbtalkessel, the North Bohemian Basin and the České Středohoří. In addition, North Bohemia and the Dresden conurbation form significant economic areas.
Cross-border transport axes in the region are the A17 / D8 freeway, the Dresden-Prague railroad line, and the Inland Waterway Elbe.

The largest cities in the region are Dresden and Ústí nad Labem.

Organization 
The Euroregion Elbe/Labe as an organization is itself not a legal entity, but a cross-border community of interests, consisting of the Municipal association Euroregion Upper Elbe Valley-Eastern Erzgebirge (Kommunalgemeinschaft Euroregion Oberes Elbtal/Osterzgebirge e.V.) and the Voluntary Association of Municipalities Euroregion Labe (Dobrovolní svazek obce Euroregion Labe).

Bodies of the Euroregion Elbe/Labe are the joint Council and the Presidium. The Council consists of 15 representatives from both sides and serves mainly the exchange between the political levels and the coordination of the strategic focus of the Euroregion. The Presidium consists of the presidents and vice-presidents of both organizations as well as their managing directors. It discusses the long-term development of the Euroregion as well as short-term decisions.

The Euroregion Elbe/Labe is represented by two co-presidents, usually the two presidents of the sub-organizations. These are currently Dirk Hilbert (Lord Mayor of Dresden) and Ing. Petr Nedvědický (Primator Ústí n. L.).

German side 
The German Kommunalgemeinschaft Euroregion Oberes Elbtal/Osterzgebirge e.V. includes the city of Dresden, the Landkreis Sächsische Schweiz-Osterzgebirge, the Großer Kreisstadt Dippoldiswalde and the Großer Kreisstadt Pirna. The statutory seat is for historical reasons in Pirna, the office is located in Dresden.

The Kommunalgemeinschaft Euroregion is a non-profit association. The highest body is the General Assembly (31 representatives), which mainly takes the decisions required by association law (budget, discharge) and elects the committee representatives. The Working Committee (12 representatives) is more active in operational work. Short-term decisions are made by the Executive Committee (5 representatives), which also represents the association externally (with two board members). President of the municipal association is currently Dirk Hilbert (Lord Mayor of Dresden), managing director is Rüdiger Kubsch.

Czech side 

The Czech Dobrovolní svazek obce Euroregion Labe unites 66 municipalities from the Ústecký kraj (Ústí nad Labem Region). The seat of the association of municipalities is in Ústí n.L.

The supreme body is the General Assembly (sněm), in which all member municipalities have a seat and a vote. Active community work takes place mainly in the Council of Euroregion Labe (not to be confused with the joint council as a cross-border body). Short-term decisions are made in the Presidium, which also represents the association of municipalities externally. The president is Ing. Petr Nedvědický (Primator Ústí n. L.), the managing director is Vladimír Lipský.

Not all Czech municipalities in the area of activity of the Euroregion Labe/Elbe are members of the association of municipalities Euroregion Labe. Among the non-members, some municipalities in the western part are members of Euroregion Krušnohoří, others in the Schluckenau corner are members of Euroregion Nisa.

Member municipalities on the Czech side are: Benešov nad Ploučnicí, Bílina, Brňany, Brzánky, Budyně nad Ohří, Bynovec, Bystřany, Černouček, Česká Kamenice, Chlumec, Chotiněves, Chuderov, Děčín, Dlažkovice, Dobkovice, Dolánky nad Ohří, Dolní Poustevna, Dubí, Dušníky, Evaň (a Horka), Františkov nad Ploučnicí, Horní Habartice, Hřensko, Huntířov, Janská, Jetřichovice, Jílové u Děčína, Krabčice, Krásná Lípa, Křešice, Kunratice, Kytlice, Libotenice, Lipová, Litoměřice, Lovečkovice, Lovosice, Malá Veleň, Malíč, Martiněves, Mikulášovice, Miřejovice, Mšené Lázně, Nové Dvory, Oleško, Petrovice, Povrly, Prackovice nad Labem, Přestavlky, Rochov, Siřejovice, Snědovice, Straškov-Vodochody, Sulejovice, Telnice, Terezín, Tisá, Travčice, Třebívlice, Trmice, Úpohlavy, Úštěk, Ústí nad Labem, Velemín, Velké Žernoseky, Vlastislav, Zubrnice.

History 
The Elbe/Labe Euroregion was founded on June 24, 1992 in Ústí nad Labem. The driving force behind the foundation was the then Primator of the city of Ústí nad Labem, Lukaš Mašin, whose initiative was taken up on the German side mainly by the District Administrator of the Pirna District, Hans-Jürgen Evers.

The association of municipalities Euroregion Labe was originally established as "Klub Euroregion Labe" with selected municipalities of political districts Děčín (western part), Teplice, Litoměřice and Ústí nad Labem as members. At the time of its establishment, on the German side, the former counties of Dippoldiswalde, Freital, Meißen, Dresden, Pirna, Sebnitz and the city of Dresden were members.

During its foundation and establishment, the Euroregion was actively supported by the Euregio on the German-Dutch border and other established border regions on the basis of many years of experience. Since 1993, the Euroregion Elbe/Labe has been a member of the Association of European Border Regions (AEBR). Thus, a close integration into European networks took place at an early stage.

From its foundation until 2014, Christian Preußcher (16.11.1955 - 03.10.2020) was the managing director of the Kommunalgemeinschaft Euroregion.

Activity

Expert groups 
The Euroregion Elbe/Labe organizes regular exchange between professionals on both sides of the border in the following expert groups:

 Regional development,
 culture, tourism, recreation,
 economy, science, education,
 civil protection and rescue,
 youth, social affairs, sports,
 transport,
 environment and nature conservation.

These expert groups meet several times a year, inform each other about current topics and developments and carry out their own projects. The aim is also the coordination of professional activities towards a positive development of the border region.

Funding 
The Euroregion Elbe/Labe has been supporting the promotion of cross-border projects with funds from the European Union since 1995.

The most important funding instrument for the Euroregion is the Small Project Fund (as it exists in other border regions), which is administered by the Euroregion itself. It has been in place since 1996 and was initially funded by the INTERREG and PHARE CBC programs, but after the Czech Republic's accession to the European Union in 2005 it was funded only by INTERREG. The Small Projects Fund is used mainly to support people-to-people projects, projects of culture and cooperation of organizations and institutions, the financial volume of which is mostly maximum 30,000 euros.

From 2000 to 2020, a total of about 650 projects were supported by the Small Projects Fund in the Elbe/Labe Euroregion.

In addition to managing the Small Projects Fund, the Euroregion also participates in decisions on projects funded by the INTERREG Saxony-Czech Republic program.

Consulting 
In the sense of a Saxon-Czech competence center, the Euroregion Elbe/Labe uses its extensive cross-border contacts, its many years of experience as well as its linguistic competences to advise institutions and private persons on cross-border activities. This ranges from the provision of information on the neighboring country to the mediation of contacts to the search for suitable financing possibilities.

Euroregion projects 
In the first years, the Euroregion was mainly concerned with initiating contacts between Saxon and Czech actors in order to promote cooperation in solving common challenges in areas such as environmental and nature protection, transport and infrastructure or tourism. The Euroregion was involved in a supportive way e.g. in the establishment of the Bilingual Friedrich-Schiller-Gymnasium Pirna, the Cross-border Mining Trail in the Upper Eastern Ore Mountains, the ferry connection between Schöna and Hřensko as well as the bus line from Dresden to Teplice.

Since 1993, the Euroregion Labe has been offering a culture pass for Czech citizens, which entitles them to discounted admission to many cultural institutions on the German side.

One of the first practical projects of the Euroregion Elbe/Labe was the construction of a section of the Elberadweg between Schöna and the border in 1999.

The Czech-German Culture Days have been organized by the Euroregion Municipal Community since 2018, after the Brücke/Most Foundation, which started the festival in 1999, was unable to continue it for financial reasons.

See also 
List of euroregions

References

External links 
 Official website of Euroregion Elbe/Labe

Euroregions
Regions of the Czech Republic
Geography of Saxony